Stolle is a surname. Notable people with the surname include:

Bruno Stolle (1915–2004), German pilot
Chris Stolle (born 1958), American politician
Fred Stolle (born 1938), Australian tennis player
Gerhard Stolle (born 1952), German athlete
Ken Stolle (born 1954), American politician
Michael Stolle (born 1974), German athlete
Philipp Stolle (1614–1675), German composer
Sandon Stolle (born 1970), 
Australian tennis player
Colin Stolle (born 1970),
American politician

See also
Stollé synthesis, a chemical reaction for the formation of oxindoles by combining anilines and α-haloacid chlorides (or oxalyl chloride)
Stol (disambiguation)
Stole (disambiguation)
Stoll (disambiguation)
Stollen, a type of cake